Dinteranthus is a genus of plants in the family Aizoaceae. It occurs in the arid northwestern parts of the Northern Cape Province, South Africa and the south-eastern parts of Namibia.

Description and taxonomy
The plants are mesembs, and resemble those genera within the family Aizoaceae to which they are most closely related; namely Lithops, Lapidaria and Schwantesia, although they require even less water and have a distinctive keel along the lower leaf surface.

The genus name of Dinteranthus is in honour of Kurt Dinter (1868–1945), a German botanist and explorer in South West Africa and the Greek word 'anthos' meaning flower.

Species list
It contains the following accepted species:
Dinteranthus inexpectatus
Dinteranthus pole-evansii
Dinteranthus puberulus
Dinteranthus vanzylii
Dinteranthus willmotianus

Kew also lists Dinteranthus microspermus (Dinter & Derenberg) Schwantes and Dinteranthus vallis-mariae (Dinter & Schwantes) B.Fearn.

References

External links
 Succulent guide.com Genus: Dinteranthus

Aizoaceae
Aizoaceae genera
Plants described in 1926
Flora of Africa
Flora of Namibia